Karl Bechler (15 February 1886 – 29 March 1945) was a German athlete, born in Danzig. He competed at the 1908 Summer Olympics in London.

In the 100 metres, Bechler finished second in his first round heat with a time of 11.4 seconds, just behind winner Patrick Roche.  The loss meant Bechler did not advance to the semifinals.

He also participated in the javelin throw competition but his result is unknown.

A veteran of World War I, in which he was awarded the Iron Cross, he died from shrapnel wounds in the last days of World War II in the cellar of his house in Danzig.

References

Sources
 
 
 

1886 births
1945 deaths
Sportspeople from Gdańsk
German male sprinters
German male javelin throwers
Olympic athletes of Germany
Athletes (track and field) at the 1908 Summer Olympics
Recipients of the Iron Cross (1914)
German civilians killed in World War II
German Army personnel of World War I
20th-century German people